Huxley is a hamlet in southern Alberta, Canada within Kneehill County. The first school was built in 1907 and named Ashcroft for John Courtland Ash, the first rancher in the area, predating the surveying of the area into homesteads.

The community has the name of Thomas Henry Huxley, an English biologist.

Demographics 

See also 
List of communities in Alberta
List of designated places in Alberta
List of hamlets in Alberta

References 

Kneehill County
Hamlets in Alberta
Designated places in Alberta